Henry Johan Johansson (September 23, 1897 – May 28, 1979) was a Swedish ice hockey player who competed in the 1928 Winter Olympics. He was a member of the Swedish ice hockey team, which won the silver medal.

References

External links

1897 births
1979 deaths
Ice hockey players at the 1928 Winter Olympics
Olympic ice hockey players of Sweden
Olympic silver medalists for Sweden
Swedish ice hockey defencemen
Olympic medalists in ice hockey
Medalists at the 1928 Winter Olympics
Södertälje SK players
People from Södertälje
Sportspeople from Stockholm County